The following articles list Olympic water polo records and statistics:

General
 Water polo at the Summer Olympics

Topics

Overall statistics
 List of men's Olympic water polo tournament records and statistics
 List of women's Olympic water polo tournament records and statistics

Champions
 List of Olympic champions in men's water polo
 List of Olympic champions in women's water polo

Team appearances
 National team appearances in the men's Olympic water polo tournament
 National team appearances in the women's Olympic water polo tournament

Player appearances
 List of players who have appeared in multiple men's Olympic water polo tournaments
 List of players who have appeared in multiple women's Olympic water polo tournaments

Medalists
 List of Olympic medalists in water polo (men)
 List of Olympic medalists in water polo (women)

Top goalscorers
 List of men's Olympic water polo tournament top goalscorers
 List of women's Olympic water polo tournament top goalscorers

Goalkeepers
 List of men's Olympic water polo tournament goalkeepers
 List of women's Olympic water polo tournament goalkeepers

Flag bearers and oath takers
 Water polo at the Summer Olympics#Water polo people at the opening and closing ceremonies

Venues
 List of Olympic venues in water polo

Teams

Men's teams

Africa
 Egypt men's Olympic water polo team records and statistics

Americas
 Brazil men's Olympic water polo team records and statistics
 Canada men's Olympic water polo team records and statistics
 United States men's Olympic water polo team records and statistics
 United States men's Olympic water polo team results

Asia
 Japan men's Olympic water polo team records and statistics
 Kazakhstan men's Olympic water polo team records and statistics

Europe

 Belgium men's Olympic water polo team records and statistics
 Croatia men's Olympic water polo team records and statistics
 France men's Olympic water polo team records and statistics
 Germany men's Olympic water polo team records and statistics
 Great Britain men's Olympic water polo team records and statistics
 Greece men's Olympic water polo team records and statistics
 Hungary men's Olympic water polo team records and statistics
 Italy men's Olympic water polo team records and statistics
 Montenegro men's Olympic water polo team records and statistics
 Netherlands men's Olympic water polo team records and statistics
 Romania men's Olympic water polo team records and statistics
 Russia men's Olympic water polo team records and statistics
 Serbia men's Olympic water polo team records and statistics
 Serbia and Montenegro men's Olympic water polo team records and statistics
 Soviet Union men's Olympic water polo team records and statistics
 Spain men's Olympic water polo team records and statistics
 Sweden men's Olympic water polo team records and statistics
 Yugoslavia men's Olympic water polo team records and statistics

Oceania
 Australia men's Olympic water polo team records and statistics

Women's teams

Americas
 Canada women's Olympic water polo team records and statistics
 United States women's Olympic water polo team records and statistics

Asia
 China women's Olympic water polo team records and statistics

Europe

 Greece women's Olympic water polo team records and statistics
 Hungary women's Olympic water polo team records and statistics
 Italy women's Olympic water polo team records and statistics
 Netherlands women's Olympic water polo team records and statistics
 Russia women's Olympic water polo team records and statistics
 Spain women's Olympic water polo team records and statistics

Oceania
 Australia women's Olympic water polo team records and statistics